The enzyme guluronate-specific alginate lyase (formerly called poly(α-L-guluronate) lyase) catalyzes the following process:

Eliminative cleavage of alginate to give oligosaccharides with 4-deoxy-α-L-erythro-hex-4-enuronosyl groups at their non-reducing ends and α-L-uluronate at their reducing end.

This enzyme belongs to the family of lyases, specifically those carbon-oxygen lyases acting on polysaccharides.  The systematic name of this enzyme class is alginate α-L-guluronate—uronate lyase. Other names in common use include alginase II, guluronate lyase, L-guluronan lyase, L-guluronate lyase, poly-α-L-guluronate lyase, and polyguluronate-specific alginate lyase'''.

Structural studies

As of late 2007, only one structure has been solved for this class of enzymes, with the PDB accession code .

References

 
 

EC 4.2.2
Enzymes of known structure